George Catlin (1796–1872) was an American painter noted for portraits of Native Americans.

George Catlin may also refer to:
 George Catlin (musical instrument maker) (1778–1852), American maker of woodwind instruments
 George S. Catlin (1808–1851), U.S. Representative from Connecticut
 Sir George Catlin (political scientist) (1896–1979), English political scientist and philosopher